Albert "Bert" Green (birth unknown – death unknown) was a Welsh professional rugby league footballer who played in the 1920s.

Playing career

International honours
Bert Green won 2 caps for Wales in 1926–27, while at Pontypridd.

County honours
Albert Green played left-, i.e. number 8, in Monmouthshire's 14–18 defeat by Glamorgan in the non-County Championship match during the 1926–27 season at Taff Vale Park, Pontypridd on Saturday 30 April 1927.

Note
There was a professional rugby league footballer who played in the 1920s and 1930s in Australia for Bluebags and Wests named Bert Green, it is not known whether this is the same person detailed in this article.

References

Monmouthshire rugby league team players
Place of birth missing
Place of death missing
Rugby league players from Pontypridd
Rugby league props
Wales national rugby league team players
Welsh rugby league players
Year of birth missing
Year of death missing